Carol Ryrie Brink (December 28, 1895 – August 15, 1981) was an American writer of over thirty juvenile and adult books. Her novel Caddie Woodlawn won the 1936 Newbery Medal and a Lewis Carroll Shelf Award in 1958.

Lifetime 
Caroline Sybil Ryrie born in Moscow, Idaho, the only child of Alexander and Henrietta (Watkins) Ryrie. Her father, an immigrant from Scotland, was the city's mayor (1895–97) and her mother was the daughter of prominent physician Dr. William W. Watkins, the first president of the state's medical association and a member of the board of regents of the new University of Idaho. After Alex Ryrie died in 1900, Henrietta remarried, but after her father was murdered in 1901, her second marriage (to Elisha Nathaniel Brown) failed and she died by suicide in 1904 at age 29. Carol was then raised in Moscow by her widowed maternal grandmother, Caroline Woodhouse Watkins, the model for Caddie Woodlawn. Her grandmother's life and storytelling abilities inspired Carol's writing from an early age.

Brink started writing for her school newspapers and continued that in college; she graduated from the Portland Academy in Oregon and attended the University of Idaho in Moscow for three years (1914–17). She wrote for The Argonaut student newspaper and Gem of the Mountains yearbook and was a member of Gamma Phi Beta sorority. She transferred to the University of California in Berkeley for her senior year in 1917 and graduated Phi Beta Kappa in 1918, then on June 12 married Raymond W. Brink, a young mathematics professor she had met in Moscow nine years earlier. He had joined the faculty at the University of Minnesota a year prior  and the couple made their home in St. Paul for 42 years. The Brinks raised a son (David) and a daughter (Nora), spent summers in the Wisconsin backwoods, and traveled for several years in Scotland and France.

Brink’s first novel, Anything Can Happen on the River, was published in 1934. Brink wrote fiction throughout her life, and added poetry and painting to her later accomplishments. After 55 years of marriage, her husband died in 1973, and she died eight years later of heart failure at age 85 in La Jolla, California. In her family, the name Caroline or Carol has been given as either a first or middle name to the oldest female child without interruption for at least seven generations, continuing to the present day.

Hometown honors
Brink was awarded an honorary doctorate of letters from the University of Idaho in 1965. At the university is Brink Hall, a faculty office building which includes the English department. A classic ivy-covered brick structure, built in the 1930s to appear much older, it was originally the Willis Sweet dormitory and later the Faculty Office Complex East. Named for her shortly after her death, its companion west building was named for Archie Phinney. Across town in east Moscow is "Carol Ryrie Brink Nature Park," a stream restoration area alongside Paradise Creek on land owned by the school district. Dedicated during the centennial celebration of Brink's  birth in 1995, its west entrance is at Mountain View Road and 7th Street. At the city's north end, the children's section at the refurbished Carnegie building of the Moscow Public Library contains the "Carol Ryrie Brink Reading Room." Opened in 1906, Brink had frequented that library as a youth.

Works

Novels

1934 Anything Can Happen on the River
1935 Caddie Woodlawn
1936 Mademoiselle Misfortune
1937 Baby Island
1937 Goody O'Grumpity
1939 All Over Town
1939 Magical Melons (Note: Magical Melons is now published as "Caddie Woodlawn's Family.")
1941 Lad with a Whistle
1944 Buffalo Coat
1945 Narcissa Whitman
1945 Minty et Compagnie
1946 Lafayette
1947 Harps in the Wind
1951 Stopover  
1952 Family Grandstand
1953 The Highly Trained Dogs of Professor Petit
1953 All I Desire
1955 The Headland
1956 Family Sabbatical
1959 The Pink Motel
1959 Strangers in the Forest
1961 The Twin Cities
1962 Chateau Saint Barnabe
1964 Snow in the River
1966 Andy Buckram's Tin Men
1968 Two Are Better Than One
1968 Winter Cottage
1972 The Bad Times of Irma Baumlein [Irma's Big Lie]
1974 Louly
1976 The Bellini Look
1977 Four Girls on a Homestead

Plays
1928 The Cupboard Was Bare
1945 Caddie Woodlawn

References 

 

American children's writers
American women novelists
American people of Scottish descent
Newbery Medal winners
Novelists from Idaho
University of Idaho alumni
University of California, Berkeley alumni
People from Moscow, Idaho
1895 births
1981 deaths
20th-century American novelists
American women children's writers
20th-century American women writers